Love Is Love may refer to:
Love Is Love (film), a 1990 Hong Kong film
Love Is Love (comics), a 2016 comic book published by DC Comics and IDW Publishing to benefit victims of the Orlando nightclub shooting
Love Is Love (album), a 1994 album by Elkie Brooks
Love Is Love/Return to Dust, a 2012 album by Code Orange
"Love Is Love" (Barry Ryan song), 1969
"Love Is Love", a song by Culture Club from the 1984 soundtrack to the film Electric Dreams
"Love Is Love", a song by Alfie Arcuri
"Love is love" is a common slogan of the gay-rights movement

See also
"Love Is Love Is Love", a song by American singer LeAnn Rimes from the 2017 album Remnants
Love Is Love Is Love (film), a 2020 American drama directed by Eleanor Coppola